The year 1755 in science and technology involved some significant events.

Astronomy
 Immanuel Kant develops the nebular hypothesis in his Universal Natural History and Theory of Heaven (Allgemeine Naturgeschichte und Theorie des Himmels).

Chemistry
 June – Joseph Black's discovery of carbon dioxide ("fixed air") and magnesium is communicated in a paper to the Philosophical Society of Edinburgh.

Earth sciences
 November 1 – An earthquake in Lisbon kills 30,000 inhabitants.
 Publication of De Litteraria expeditione per pontificiam ditionem ad dimetiendos duos meridiani gradus a PP, a description of the measurement of a meridian arc carried out in the Papal States by Ruđer Bošković with Christopher Maire in 1750–52.

Mathematics
 Leonhard Euler's Institutiones calculi differentialis is published.

Technology
 December 2 – The second Eddystone Lighthouse (1709–1755), with a wooden cone, catches fire and burns to the ground; it will be rebuilt in stone.
 While serving as Postmaster General of the northern American colonies, Benjamin Franklin invents a simple odometer, attached to his horse carriage, to help analyze the best routes for delivering the mail.
 approx. date – Thomas Mudge invents the lever escapement for timepieces.

Awards
 Copley Medal: John Huxham

Births
 January 28 – Samuel Thomas von Sömmerring, Prussian physician, anatomist, paleontologist and inventor (died 1830).
 April 11 – James Parkinson, English surgeon (died 1824).
 June 15 – Antoine François, French chemist (died 1809)
 October 11 – Fausto Elhuyar, Spanish chemist (died 1833).
 October 28 – Jacques Labillardière, French naturalist (died 1834).
 Maria Elizabetha Jacson, English botanist (died 1829).

Deaths
 May 20 – Johann Georg Gmelin, botanist, natural historian and geographer (born 1709)

References

 
18th century in science
1750s in science